The 1952 Spanish motorcycle Grand Prix was the eighth and final round of the 1952 Grand Prix motorcycle racing season. It took place on 5 October 1952 at the Montjuïc circuit.

500 cc classification

125 cc classification

Sidecar classification

References

Spanish motorcycle Grand Prix
Spain
Motorcycle Grand Prix